Merced Peak, with an elevation of , is the highest point in the Clark Range, just surpassing three other peaks; Red Peak (11,704 feet), Gray Peak (11,578 feet), and Mount Clark (11,527 feet).

Merced Peak is located close to southern border of Yosemite National Park, near the Ottoway Lakes. The summit can be approached from the Quartz Mountain Trailhead over Chiquito pass or from one of two trailheads on the road to Glacier Point.

In 1871, influential Scottish-American naturalist John Muir discovered an active alpine glacier below Merced Peak, which helped his theory that Yosemite Valley was formed by glacial action gain acceptance.

Climate
According to the Köppen climate classification system, Merced Peak is located in an alpine climate zone. Most weather fronts originate in the Pacific Ocean, and travel east toward the Sierra Nevada mountains. As fronts approach, they are forced upward by the peaks (orographic lift), causing moisture in the form of rain or snowfall to drop onto the range.

See also

 Intrusive Suite of Merced Peak

Gallery

References

External links 

 
 "Merced Peak". Climber.org.

Mountains of Merced County, California
Mountains of Yosemite National Park
Mountains of Northern California
Sierra Nevada (United States)